Halton General Hospital is a health facility at Runcorn, Cheshire, England. It is managed by the Warrington & Halton Hospitals NHS Foundation Trust.

History
The first phase of the hospital, which consisted of out-patient facilities, opened on 21 September 1976; the second phase, which involved in-patient facilities, was completed in 1985. Management of the hospital passed to the Halton General Hospital NHS Trust in 1993. The minor injuries unit was refurbished in November 2003 and a new urgent care centre was established at the hospital in 2015.

In 2018 it was proposed the hospital be replaced with a modern treatment centre.

References

Hospitals in Cheshire
NHS hospitals in England
Buildings and structures in Runcorn